Bruce Stephen Hemara (born 19 October 1957) is a former New Zealand rugby union player. A hooker, Hemara represented Manawatu at a provincial level, and was a member of the New Zealand national side, the All Blacks, for the team's 1985 tour of Argentina. He played three matches for the All Blacks but did appear in any tests.

References

1957 births
Living people
Rugby union players from Palmerston North
People educated at Palmerston North Boys' High School
New Zealand rugby union players
New Zealand international rugby union players
Manawatu rugby union players
Rugby union hookers
Māori All Blacks players